Harpendyreus meruana is a butterfly in the family Lycaenidae. It is found in Tanzania (from the northern part of the country to Mount Meru).

References

Endemic fauna of Tanzania
Butterflies described in 1910
Harpendyreus